Paind is a village near Shutrana which is in Punjab, India. It belongs to Patiala District.

Villages in Patiala district